Benizalón is a municipality of the Almería province, in the autonomous community of Andalusia, Spain.

Demographics

References

Municipalities in the Province of Almería